The following is a list of awards and nominations received by James Spader.

Spader, a three-time Primetime Emmy Award winner, is best known for his role as Raymond Reddington from The Blacklist, as well as Alan Shore on The Practice and its spin-off Boston Legal. His role as Shore earned Spader his three Emmy wins, with a fourth nomination; as well as a Golden Globe Award nomination and multiple nominations through the Screen Actors Guild Awards in both the comedy and drama series categories.

As of 2013, he stars as Raymond "Red" Reddington on The Blacklist, which earned him his second Golden Globe Award nomination in 2014.

Motion picture awards

Independent Spirit Awards

Saturn Awards

Screen Actors Guild Awards

Television awards

Golden Globe Awards

People's Choice Awards

Primetime Emmy Awards

Satellite Awards

Saturn Awards

Screen Actors Guild Awards

Critic awards

Chicago Film Critics Association Awards

Southeastern Film Critics Association Awards

Festival awards

Cannes Film Festival

Monte-Carlo Television Festival

References

External links
 
 
 
 James Spader at Emmys.com

Spader, James